Atlanta  is a community in the Canadian province of Nova Scotia, located in Kings County.

References

Communities in Kings County, Nova Scotia